Beyond the Apocalypse is the second studio album by Norwegian black metal band 1349. It was released in 2004 through Candlelight Records.

Track listing 
All songs published by Tanglade Music/Abstract Sounds.
 "Chasing Dragons" – 6:31 (Ravn, Archaon)
 "Beyond the Apocalypse" – 4:01 (Ravn, Archaon, Tjalve)
 "Aiwass-Aeon" – 3:32 (Ravn, Archaon, Tjalve, Seidemann)
 "Nekronatalenheten" – 4:30 (Ravn, Archaon, Tjalve, Seidemann)
 "Perished in Pain" – 3:57 (Ravn, Archaon, Tjalve, Seidemann)
 "Singer of Strange Songs" – 7:30 (Archaon, Tjalve, Seidemann)
 "Blood Is the Mortar" – 3:52 (Archaon, Destroyer, Tjalve, Frost)
 "Internal Winter" – 7:41 (Archaon, Tjalve, Seidemann)
 "The Blade" – 5:58 (Ravn, Tjalve, Seidemann)

Personnel 
1349
 Ravn – vocals, drums ("The Blade")
 Archaon – guitar
 Tjalve – guitar
 Seidemann – bass, harmonium
 Frost – drums

Production
 Ronni Le Tekrø – executive production
 1349 – arrangement, production
 Ravn – production
 Kjartan Hesthagen – recording, engineering
 Dr. Davidsen – recording, engineering
 Tom Kvallsvoll – mastering

Critical reception 

AllMusic's Alex Henderson called the album a "nasty, harsh, brutally skullcrushing blast of Scandinavian death metal/black metal that lacks even the slightest trace of subtlety".

References 

2004 albums
1349 (band) albums
Candlelight Records albums